Myelois mystica is a species of snout moth in the genus Myelois. It was described by Roesler in 1988, and is known from Afghanistan (including Paghman, the type location).

References

Moths described in 1988
Phycitini